Nidumukkala is a village in Guntur district of the Indian state of Andhra Pradesh. It is located in Tadikonda mandal of Guntur revenue division. It forms a part of Andhra Pradesh Capital Region.

Demographics 

As per census 2011 Nidumukkala has a population of 4077 of which 2005 are males while 2072 are females. Average Sex Ratio of Nidumukkala village is 1033. Child population is 418 which makes up 10.25% of total population of village with sex ratio 1000. In 2011, literacy rate of Agadallanka village was 63.60% when compared to 67.02% of Andhra Pradesh.

Government and politics 

Lam gram panchayat is the local self-government of the village. It is divided into wards and each ward is represented by a ward member. The ward members are headed by a Sarpanch.

See also 
List of villages in Guntur district

References 

Villages in Guntur district